In astronomy, a Julian year (symbol: a or aj)  is a unit of measurement of time defined as exactly 365.25 days of  SI seconds each. The length of the Julian year is the average length of the year in the Julian calendar that was used in Western societies until the adoption of the Gregorian Calendar, and from which the unit is named.  Nevertheless, because astronomical Julian years are measuring duration rather than designating dates, this Julian year does not correspond to years in the Julian calendar or any other calendar. Nor does it correspond to the many other ways of defining a year.

Usage 
The Julian year is not a unit of measurement in the International System of Units (SI), but it is recognized by the International Astronomical Union (IAU) as a non-SI unit for use in astronomy. Before 1984, both the Julian year and the mean tropical year were used by astronomers. In 1898, Simon Newcomb used both in his Tables of the Sun in the form of the Julian century (36 525 days) and the "solar century" ( days), a rounded form of 100 mean tropical years of  each according to Newcomb. However, the mean tropical year is not suitable as a unit of measurement because it varies from year to year by a small amount,  days according to Newcomb. In contrast, the Julian year is defined in terms of the SI unit one second, so is as accurate as that unit and is constant. It approximates both the sidereal year and the tropical year to about ±0.008 days. The Julian year is the basis of the definition of the light-year as a unit of measurement of distance.

Epochs

In astronomy, an epoch specifies a precise moment in time.  The positions of celestial objects and events, as measured from Earth, change over time, so when measuring or predicting celestial positions, the epoch to which they pertain must be specified.  A new standard epoch is chosen about every 50 years.

The standard epoch in use today is Julian epoch J2000.0. Julian within its name indicates that other Julian epochs can be a number of Julian years of 365.25 days each before or after J2000.0.

Because Julian years are not exactly the same length as years on the Gregorian calendar, astronomical epochs will diverge noticeably from the Gregorian calendar in a few hundred years. For example, in the next 1000 years, seven days will be dropped from the Gregorian calendar but not from 1000 Julian years, so J3000.0 will be .

Julian calendar distinguished 

The Julian year, being a uniform measure of duration, should not be confused with the variable length historical years in the Julian calendar. An astronomical Julian year is never individually numbered.

Julian day distinguished 

A Julian year should not be confused with the Julian day, which is also used in astronomy (more properly called the Julian day number or JDN). The JDN uniquely specifies a place in time, without becoming bogged down in its date-in-month, week, month, or year in any particular calendar. Despite the similarity of names, there is almost no connection between the Julian day numbers and Julian years.

The Julian day number is a simplified time-keeping system originally intended to ease calculation with historical dates which involve a diversity of local, idiosyncratic calendars. It was adopted by astronomers in the mid-1800s, and identifies each date as the integer number of days that have elapsed since a reference date ("epoch"), chosen to precede most, if not all, historical records. A specific time within a day, always using UTC, is specified via a decimal fraction.

References

External links

Types of year
Time in astronomy
Year